European route E 51 is a road part of the International E-road network. It begins in Berlin and ends in Nuremberg, Germany.

Route 
Berlin - Leipzig - Gera - Hirschberg - Hof - Bayreuth - Nuremberg

References

External links 
 UN Economic Commission for Europe: Overall Map of E-road Network (2007)

51
E051